The 2000 FIA GT Lausitzring 500 km was the eighth round the 2000 FIA GT Championship season.  It took place at the Lausitzring, Germany, on September 2, 2000.  The event was shared with a round of the Deutsche Tourenwagen Masters.

Official results
Class winners in bold.  Cars failing to complete 70% of winner's distance marked as Not Classified (NC).

† – #2 Chamberlain Motorsport was disqualified for unsporting conduct during the race.

Statistics
 Pole position – #25 Carsport Holland – 1:43.854
 Fastest lap – #14 Lister Storm Racing – 1:43.830
 Average speed – 190.897 km/h

References

 
 
 

L
FIA GT Lausitzing